Cat Tien may refer to:
Cát Tiên District, Lâm Đồng Province
Cat Tien (Vietnamese American singer) (Cát Tiên), a Vietnamese American popular singer
Cát Tiên National Park (Vườn quốc gia Cát Tiên)
South Cát Tiên National Park (Vườn quốc gia Nam Cát Tiên)
Cát Tiên archaeological site